The Archer: Fugitive from the Empire, also known as Fugitive from the Empire and The Archer and the Sorceress, is a 1981 American made for television sword and sorcery adventure film written, directed and produced by Nicholas J. Corea.

Plot 
Malveel, an area inhabited by clans of nomadic people who battle against each other, is in danger of being conquered by the rising Draikianian empire, mainly called The Dynasty. After a long time, King Brakus, ruler of the Falcon Clan, is able to gather and finally peacefully unite several antagonizing clans, and thereafter tries to win them over for the combat against their shared foe. However, there is treachery in his own ranks: His nephews Sandros and Riis have contacted the Dynasty in their craving for power, and so the Dynasty's supreme warlord Gar and his snake people command the two to get rid of Brakus. Meanwhile, Brakus' son Toran has a clash with the beautiful sorceress Estra, whose mother was murdered by Brakus under the order of his mentor Lazar-Sa. At the end, Estra is giving Toran a cryptical prophecy where she is promising him a hopeless search.

The story goes on with Brakus getting killed in that same night by Gar using Toran's dagger, which had been secretly stolen by Sandros. While breathing his last, Brakus wrests a last promise from his son Toran: Search for Lazar-Sa so the king's efforts weren't in vain. Toran is found with the corpse of his father, and is kept captive as his murderer. Toran's old mentor Mak, who is the bearer of a magic bow, frees Toran, and together they both start the search for Lazar-Sa while being chased by Gar and his snake people, who are determined to prevent a new alliance of the clans of Malveel under the leadership of the Falcons. To ensure that, Gar kills Sandros and Riis. Drained by their escape and his age, Mak turns over the magic bow to his apprentice, dying when the bow severs his old bond to unite with Toran.

Toran is able to wound Gar at their next confrontation, which gets the attention of the rogue Slant, who henceforth joins Toran. Although Slant initially tries to steal the bow, he starts taking a genuine liking to Toran and aids him with his world wisdom. At the same time, Estra starts her search for Lazar-Sa to kill him and avenge her mother. In the city of Kamal, Toran, Estra and Slant clash with a person claiming to be Lazar-Sa and trying to chase the people out of the area. Toran, Estra and Slant are asked by the city council to end the menace. Because Lazar-Sa is their common target, the three agree and travel to a canyon where the sorcerer is hiding. After their departure, Gar also finds his way to Kamal, where he picks up Toran's trail again.

In the canyon, the three meet Lazar-Sa. They realize very quickly that he is just a magical simulacrum controlled by an ex-slave from Kamal named Rega. He once met Lazar-Sa and got a magical stone and a gauntlet from him to take revenge for the humiliations he has suffered. Rega tells the three where Lazar-Sa was seen last, but then kills himself because his scheme is revealed. Gar, who followed Toran, seizes the gauntlet and challenges Toran. During the battle, Toran strikes Lazar-Sa's stone with an arrow, rendering it unstable. The stone's power destroys the canyon, but Toran, Estra and Slant escape.

Following that, Estra parts from her former companions to follow her own path of finding Lazar-Sa. Toran and Slant are on their way back to Kamal when a message from Lazar-Sa reaches them. Lazar-Sa is promising Toran to lead him to his higher purpose if he frees the sorcerer from his current prison: The Endworld. What Toran and Slant don't know is that Gar also survived the catastrophe in the canyon and still hungers for Toran's death.

Production
Originally the television film was produced as a pilot for a planned television series by NBC, but the series never saw the light of day. This explains the open ending of the film (mainly that Lazar-Sa was not found and the group declares the search for him as a target). In comparison to films like Dragonslayer (1981) the technical possibilities of the early 1980s were not utilized to the fullest. Quite successful is the look of the masks and the makeup effects used to portray the Snake People. Mainly involved in it was John Goodwin (The Thing, Men in Black). The film-score that was composed by the synthesizer-specialist Ian Underwood is one of the first soundtracks ever completely produced electronically.

Reception
The film had more success abroad as it "received some theatrical exposure" across Europe  and publications on media like VHS and DVD (29. April 2011, Koch Media) in Germany.

Critical response

Larry DiTillio reviewed The Archer: Fugitive from the Empire for Different Worlds magazine and stated that "The worst thing about the demise of The Archer as a series is that with the success of Excalibur and all the upcoming sword & sorcery in film, some kind of fantasy series will appear sooner or later. In the case of The Archer we would have had a series helmed by a fantasy buff, and written by writers familiar with the area (Nick was adamant on seeking out such scribblers to insure that the show would please fantasy fans)."

Cast 
 Main actor Lane Caudell named his 1982 born son Toran after the hero he portrayed in the movie.

See also
 Reptilian conspiracy theory— Robert E. Howard's short story "The Shadow Kingdom" from Weird Tales magazine is the origin of both the sword and sorcery subgenre of fantasy fiction and the conspiracy theory concerning a hidden species of advanced reptilian beings disguised among us while covertly controlling the levers of power, which has been a recurring theme in fiction and conspiracy since the story's publication.

External links

References 

1981 films
1980s fantasy adventure films
American fantasy adventure films
American sword and sorcery films
Films set in prehistory
Films set in a fictional country
1980s English-language films
Television pilots not picked up as a series
1980s American films